Ian Leonard Osborne (born 28 October 1952) is an English former professional footballer who played in the Football League for Birmingham City and Port Vale.

Career
Osborne was born in Leicester. When he left school in 1968, he joined Birmingham City as an apprentice, and turned professional two years later. A pacey full back, he spent a long time in the reserve team before eventually making his debut in the First Division on 16 August 1975, the opening game of the 1975–76 season, in a 3–3 draw at Leicester City. Osborne played a few more games that season, deputising for Ray Martin who was nearing the end of his Birmingham career, but his defending was not considered up to standard and he was allowed to leave. He then spent a season with Port Vale where he played the opening six games of the season for the Third Division side. After losing his place in September 1976 he did not get another game until April the next year, though he did play nine of the last ten games. He left on a free transfer in May 1977, moving into non-league football with Hillingdon Borough and Westfields.

Career statistics
Source:

References

1952 births
Living people
Footballers from Leicester
English footballers
Association football fullbacks
Birmingham City F.C. players
Port Vale F.C. players
Hillingdon Borough F.C. players
Westfields F.C. players
English Football League players